Claremont is a town in Saint Ann Parish, Jamaica.

The district of Claremont was first called "Finger Post" until it was renamed in honour of the first house built there, "Clermont House". The countryside around the town has for centuries been home to the wealthy landed gentry, and still today is dotted with estate houses. The wealth associated with the area is seen in the architecture and plan of the town; the shops of Claremont High Street exhibit fine architectural detail and finishing. 

The town clock was presented to Claremont in 1915 by Tom Dobson Esq. of Carton Pen.

References

Populated places in Saint Ann Parish